David Perry Crawley was Archbishop of Kootenay and Metropolitan of British Columbia and Yukon from 1994 to 2004.

He was born in 1937, the son of the  Rev. Canon George Antony Crawley and Lucy Lillian Ball, and educated at the University of Manitoba and the University of Kent at Canterbury. He was ordained in 1961  and was the incumbent at  St Thomas', Sherwood Park until 1966. He was Canon Missioner at All Saints Cathedral, Edmonton from  1967 until 1970 and Rector of  St Matthew's, Winnipeg from 1971 until 1977. He was Archdeacon of Winnipeg from 1974 to 1977 and of Rupert's Land until 1981. He was a Lecturer at St John's College, Winnipeg from 1981 to 1982 after that Rector of St Michael and All Angels, Regina (1982–85).

In 1985 he became the twelfth rector of St. Paul's, Vancouver where he sought to heal the relationship between the parish and the local LGBT community and to minister to the members of that community who were at the time dealing with the AIDS crisis.  He wrote an account of his experiences in A parish transformed.  In 1990 he resigned his position at St Paul's on being elected to the episcopate (as Bishop of Kootenay) in 1990. 

He has been twice married and has three daughters.

References

1937 births
University of Manitoba alumni
Anglican Church of Canada archdeacons
Academic staff of the University of Manitoba
Anglican bishops of Kootenay
20th-century Anglican Church of Canada bishops
21st-century Anglican Church of Canada bishops
Metropolitans of British Columbia
21st-century Anglican archbishops
Living people
Archdeacons of Winnipeg